Acacia sessilis is a shrub of the genus Acacia and the subgenus Phyllodineae that is endemic to south western Australia.

Description
It has spiny branchlets that are covered in small woolly hairs with caducous stipules. Like most species of Acacia it has phyllodes rather than true leaves. It blooms from July to October and produces yellow flowers.

Taxonomy
The species was first formally described by the botanist George Bentham as a part of the William Jackson Hooker work Notes on Mimoseae, with a synopsis of species as published in the London Journal of Botany. It was reclassified as Racosperma sessile in 2003 then transferred back to genus Acacia in 2006.
The specific epithet is derived from Latin meaning fit for sitting on in reference to the phyllodes or flowers growing directly from the stem without a stalk.

Distribution
It is native to an area along the west coast in the Mid West, Wheatbelt and Peel regions of Western Australia where it is found growing in gravelly clay or lateritic sandy soils. It is found from around Geraldton in the north west to around Yarloop in the south east.

See also
 List of Acacia species

References

sessilis
Acacias of Western Australia
Taxa named by George Bentham
Plants described in 1842